Phinehas Howe Richards (November 15, 1788 – November 25, 1874) was an early leader in the Church of Jesus Christ of Latter-day Saints (LDS Church) and in Utah Territory. His first name is also spelled Phineas in some records.

Richards was born in Framingham, Middlesex County, Massachusetts. He was a brother of Willard Richards and the father of Franklin D. Richards and Henry P. Richards. He married Wealthy Dewey in 1818. In, 1825 he was appointed county coroner.  His oldest son, George Spencer Richards died at age 15 at the Haun's Mill Massacre in 1838.

Richards joined the Church of the Latter Day Saints in 1837. He was a member of high councils at Kirtland, Nauvoo, Winter Quarters and Salt Lake City. He also served as a member of the Nauvoo City Council. As a member of the Nauvoo City Council he cited the condition of his dead son in arguing why he viewed the Nauvoo Expositor as a nuisance that the city should protect.

In Utah the 1st Utah territorial legislature, where he also was the chaplain. In 1844, Richards published an appeal to the citizens of Massachusetts asking them to take action on the matter of the wrongs Missouri had inflicted upon the Latter-day Saints.

Notes

References
 Jessee, Dean C., "Biographical Register" in The Papers of Joseph Smith: Vol. 2 p. 584
 Joseph Smith. History of the Church. vol. 6, p. 193.
 Stevenson, Joseph Grant, "Richards Family History: Volume 1" pp. 110–267

1788 births
1874 deaths
19th-century American politicians
American leaders of the Church of Jesus Christ of Latter-day Saints
Converts to Mormonism
Latter Day Saints from Illinois
Latter Day Saints from Massachusetts
Latter Day Saints from Ohio
Latter Day Saints from Utah
Members of the Utah Territorial Legislature
Mormon pioneers
People from Framingham, Massachusetts